John Dean Lewis Burkinshaw (12 May 1890 – 1947) was an English professional footballer who played as a wing half.

References

1890 births
1947 deaths
People from Kilnhurst
English footballers
Association football wing halves
Kilnhurst Colliery F.C. players
Grimsby Town F.C. players
Rotherham Town F.C. (1899) players
Swindon Town F.C. players
Sheffield Wednesday F.C. players
Bradford (Park Avenue) A.F.C. players
Accrington Stanley F.C. (1891) players
Denaby United F.C. players
Wath Athletic F.C. players
Bricklayers and Masons F.C. players
English Football League players
English expatriate sportspeople in the United States
Expatriate soccer players in the United States
English expatriate footballers